Łukasz Żelezny, known as DeeJay Delta (born 23 March 1981 in Tarnowskie Góry, South Poland) is an electronic music artist, and disc jockey, currently living London. As a musician he works within the dark drum and bass genres like techstep, neurofunk. Before, he was a member of Amiga demoscene (1993–1998).

Selected discography 
 Hipnoza (CD); Fantom Flight Recordings 2004
 Rigour EP (CD, EP); Foundname Records 2004
 Witch Hunt (File, MP3); Combat Recordings (2) 2005
 Sidney Polak - Trzeci Wymiar (DeeJay Delta Remix); Emi Music 2005

External links 
 Official website
 DeeJay Delta on RollDaBeats.Com
 Official discography

Drum and bass musicians
1981 births
Polish electronic musicians
Polish musicians
Living people